Mitchell Iles-Crevatin (born 25 March 1999) is an Australian sports shooter. He competed in the men's trap event at the 2016 Summer Olympics.

Records

References

External links
 

1999 births
Living people
Australian male sport shooters
Olympic shooters of Australia
Shooters at the 2016 Summer Olympics
Sportspeople from Melbourne
21st-century Australian people